The Talbot County School District is a public school district in Talbot County, Georgia, United States, based in Talbotton. It serves the communities of Geneva, Junction City, Manchester, Talbotton, and Woodland.

Schools
The Talbot County School District has one school, housing pre-school through twelfth grade in one building.
Central Elementary/High School

References

External links

School districts in Georgia (U.S. state)
Education in Talbot County, Georgia